Established by Decree No 1 of July 5, 1879, the Ministry of Justice of Bulgaria is the link between the executive and judicial branches of power. It directs the writing of new laws related to the judiciary and offers feedback on laws prepared by other government organizations.

List of ministers

Minister of Justice (1879–1997)

Minister for Justice and Legal European Integration (1997–1999)

Minister of Justice (1999–present)

See also 

 Justice ministry
Министър на правосъдието на България (Minister of Justice of Bulgaria)
 Politics of Bulgaria

Sources

External links 
 

Ministries of Bulgaria
Lists of office-holders
Justice ministries
Law of Bulgaria